Danil Chaban (born 8 July 1974) is a Russian luger. He competed at the 1998 Winter Olympics and the 2002 Winter Olympics.

References

External links
 

1974 births
Living people
Russian male lugers
Olympic lugers of Russia
Lugers at the 1998 Winter Olympics
Lugers at the 2002 Winter Olympics
People from Bratsk
Sportspeople from Irkutsk Oblast